La Pivellina (The Little One) is a 2009 Austrian feature film debut directed by Tizza Covi and Rainer Frimmel. The film premiered at the 2009 Cannes Film Festival in the Directors' Fortnight, where it has been awarded the Europa Cinemas Label as Best European Film.

Plot 
Abandoned in a park, the two-year-old girl Asia is found by Patty, a circus woman living with her husband Walter in a trailer park in San Basilio on the outskirts of Rome. With the help of Tairo, a teenager who lives with his grandma in an adjacent container, Patti gives the girl a new home for an uncertain period of time. However, Walter is concerned that they may be accused of kidnapping the girl, and he plans to report Asia's presence to the police.

Patty receives a letter from the mother in which she announces that she will collect the girl two days later. They have a farewell party, but the mother does not show up.

Cast 
 Patrizia Gerardi as Patty
 Walter Saabel as Walter
 Asia Crippa as Asia
 Tairo Caroli as Tairo

Release 
La Pivellina has been screened in more than 130 International Film Festivals (including Berlinale, Toronto, Karlovy Vary, New York, San Francisco, Palm Springs) and received over 35 awards. La Pivellina is being released in more than 20 countries worldwide (including USA, Argentina, France, Italy, Brazil, Germany). The film was selected as the Austrian entry for the Best Foreign Language Film at the 83rd Academy Awards, but it didn't make the final shortlist.

Awards (selection) 
 2009 may, Festival International du Film de Cannes		
   
Prix Europa Cinemas Label  - Best European Film
		
 2009 June, Pesaro Film Festival		
  
Premio "Lino Miccichè"  - Best Feature Film		
 2009 aug, International Film Summerfest Durres		
  
Golden Gladiator for Best Feature Film		
 2009 aug, Annecy Cinéma Italien		
  
Prix d'Interprétation Féminine (Patrizia Gerardi) - Best Actress 		
 Prix Spécial du Jury		
 2009 oct, Kyiv International Film Festival Molodist		

Ecumenical Jury Prize		
Grand Prix "Scythian Deer" for Best Feature Film		
  Yves Montand Prize for Best Acting (Patrizia Gerardi) 	
 2009 oct, Mumbai International Film Festival		
 
Jury Grand Prize		
 2009 oct, Valdivia International Film Festival		
  Mejor Película  - Best Feature Film		
 Premió de Público - Audience Award		
 2009 nov, Leeds International Film Festival		
  Golden Owl Award for Best Feature Film		
 2009 nov, Gijón International Film Festival  		
Premio "Principado de Asturias" Mejor Largometraje  - Best Feature Film		
 Premio Mejor Actriz (Patrizia Gerardi) - Best Actress		
 2009 nov, Castellininaria Festival Internazionale del Cinema Giovane Bellizona		
   Premio “Ambiente e Salute: Qualità di Vita”		
 2010 jan, Festival Premiers Plans d'Angers		
   Grand Prix for Best Feature Film		
 Prix Mademoiselle Ladubay Long Metrage - Best Actress	(Patrizia Gerardi)	
 2010 mar, Diagonale 		
  Grand Prix for Best Austrian Feature Film 2009/10		
 2010 apr, Indie Lisboa 		
  Distribution Award Caixa Geral de Depósitos		
 2010 apr, Festival Cinematográfico Internacional de Uruguay 		
  Mencione del Jurado		
 Mencione del Jurado FIPRESCI Uruguay		
 2010 April, Buenos Aires Festival Internacional de Cine Independiente		
 Premio UNICEF		
 2010 June, Nastri d'Argento:		
  Menzione Speciale Migliore Opera Prima		
 2010 July, Bimbi Belli Roma		
Premio Miglior Film  - Best Feature Film		
   Premio Miglior Attrice - Best Actress (Patrizia Gerardi)			
 2010 July, Gallio Film Festival		
Premio del Pubblico – Audience Award		
Premio Migliore Opera Prima 		
 2010 aug, Sarzana Film Festival 		
  Premio "Cineforum Sarzana" Migliore Film  - Best Feature Film

See also
 List of submissions to the 83rd Academy Awards for Best Foreign Language Film
 List of Austrian submissions for the Academy Award for Best Foreign Language Film

References 

Screendaily: La Pivellina wins Diagonale Grand Prix

Notes
 Karin Schiefer, AFC, April 2009, Tizza Covi & Rainer Frimmel: La Pivellina - Interview 
 Natasha Senjanovic, April 27, 2010,The Hollywood Reporter
 Bénédicte Prot, May 19, 2009, Cineuropa
 Jon Davies,2009, Cinemascope
 Pablo Suárez, Buenos Aires Herald 
 Boyd Van Hoeij, May 19, 2009, Variety
 Jason Anderson, Eye Weekly

External links

 Official Website
 Austrian Film Commission

2009 films
Austrian drama films
2000s Italian-language films
2009 drama films